Aguaje de Las Berendas, or Antelope Springs, is a spring in located on the west side of the San Joaquin Valley, at the foot of the foothills of the Diablo Range, in Merced County, California.

History 

Aguaje de Las Berendas (Waterhole of the Pronghorns), later called Antelope Springs, was as its name suggests, the site of a waterhole used by Pronghorn, Elk, and other wild game.  Indian mortars, and other evidence have been found that show a hill to the north of this vicinity was once used as an Indian encampment. Later it was a watering place on El Camino Viejo, between Arroyo de Mesteño to the north and the Arroyo de Quinto to the south.

References

El Camino Viejo